Aufbau-Verlag is a German publisher. It was founded in Berlin in 1945 and became the biggest publisher in the GDR. During that time it specialised in socialist and Russian literature.

It is currently led by Matthias Koch, René Strien, and Tom Erben.

Further reading 
  (NB.
  (NB. According to Christoph Links this work contains a number of factual errors.)
  (NB.
   (NB.
   (NB.
NB. This work is based on the author's dissertation at  under the title  in 2008.)

External links 
 Website

1945 establishments in Germany
Companies based in Berlin
Publishing companies established in 1945
Mass media in Berlin
Publishing companies of Germany
Book publishing companies of Germany
Companies of East Germany
German companies established in 1945